Staphylinochrous meinickei is a species of moth of the Anomoeotidae family. It is found in Tanzania.

References

Endemic fauna of Tanzania
Anomoeotidae
Insects of Tanzania
Moths of Africa